Luciano Benetton (born 13 May 1935) is an Italian billionaire businessman and one of the co-founders of Benetton Group, an Italian fashion brand. He served as the chairman of Benetton from 1978 to 2012.

Early life 
Luciano Benetton was born on 13 May 1935 in Treviso. His father had a small business and following his death, Benetton dropped out of school at the age of 14 to work in a clothing shop. He saved money to buy a $200 knitting machine and teamed up with his sister to produce a collection of twenty pieced of yellow, green and pale blue sweaters.

Career 
In 1965, together with his siblings Giuliana, Carlo and Gilberto, he founded Benetton Group.

In 1992, he was elected to the Italian Senate.

In 2003, he announced that his family is stepping down from running the company, due to decreasing sales and increased competition.

In May 2015, Forbes estimated the net worth of Luciano Benetton and each of his three siblings at US$2.9 billion.

Personal life 
He is married with four children and lives in Treviso. His son Alessandro chaired Benetton Group from April 2012 to May 2014.

References

External links 
Files about his parliamentary activities (in Italian): XI legislature

1935 births
Living people
Luciano
Italian billionaires
Italian Republican Party politicians
Formula One team owners
Italian motorsport people
Benetton Formula
Compasso d'Oro Award recipients